Ruslana Tsykhotska (Ukrainian: Руслана Цихоцька; born 23 March 1986) is a Ukrainian athlete specialising in the triple jump. She represented her country at the 2016 Summer Olympics as well as the 2011 and 2013 World Championships.

International competitions

Personal bests
Outdoor
Long jump – 6.44 (-0.6 m/s, Yalta 2011)
Triple jump – 14.53 (+1.0 m/s, Yalta 2012)
Indoor
Long jump – 6.40 (Sumy 2012)
Triple jump – 14.00 (Kiev 2012)

References

1986 births
Living people
Ukrainian female triple jumpers
Athletes (track and field) at the 2016 Summer Olympics
Olympic athletes of Ukraine